Icenticaftor (development code QBW251) is a drug candidate for the treatment of chronic obstructive pulmonary disease (COPD) and cystic fibrosis. The drug is being developed by Novartis.

Like ivacaftor (which is marketed as Kalydeco), icenticaftor functions by acting as a stimulator of the protein cystic fibrosis transmembrane conductance regulator (CFTR).

References 

Experimental drugs
Drugs acting on the respiratory system
Pyridines
Trifluoromethyl compounds
Amides
Methoxy compounds
Tertiary alcohols